Norwood is an unincorporated community in Pulaski County, Kentucky, United States.

References

Unincorporated communities in Pulaski County, Kentucky
Unincorporated communities in Kentucky